Bridgeton Township is a township in Bucks County, Pennsylvania, United States. The population was 1,277 at the 2010 census.  The township was originally a part of adjacent Nockamixon Township, but a division was arranged and signed on May 24, 1890.  This accord split an area of Nockamixon which ran west from the banks of the Delaware River to approximately one third the breadth of the original township. This smaller area was  named "Bridgeton", as it was the site of Upper Black Eddy-Milford Bridge covered wooden truss bridge built in 1842, which connected the towns of Upper Black Eddy and Milford, New Jersey.  The original covered bridge was replaced by a truss bridge in 1933. The township originally contained several tiny hamlets, such as the aforementioned Upper Black Eddy, Narrowsville, and Rupletown.  Upper Black's Eddy, as it was originally called, and Raubsville were named for notable landholders, while Narrowsville was named for a particularly thin portion of the Delaware River.  With the construction of a centralized post office in Upper Black Eddy, the usage of separate names for the smaller towns ceased in an official capacity, and the everyday errands of residents became centered on the largest of the towns.  What little commercial trade exists in the township is now centered solely in Upper Black Eddy, with any evidence of there being any distinctive, smaller villages existing only on outdated road-signs and maps. Ringing Rocks Park is located within the township, as well as state game hunting lands.  Bridgeton Township is also home to the Homestead General Store, the oldest continually operating general store on the Delaware Canal.

Geography
It is drained by the Delaware River, which separates it from New Jersey. Its villages include Narrowsville, Rupletown, and Upper Black Eddy.

Natural Features
Cauffman Hill, Falls Creek, Mine Spring, Narrows Creek, The Narrows, and Ringing Rocks.

Neighboring municipalities
Tinicum Township (southeast)
Nockamixon Township (southwest)
Holland Township, New Jersey (north)

Demographics

As of the 2010 census, the township was 96.5% White, 0.4% Black or African American, 0.1% Native American, 0.5% Asian, and 0.8% were two or more races. 1.7% of the population were of Hispanic or Latino ancestry.

As of the census of 2000, there were 1,408 people, 559 households, and 398 families residing in the township.  The population density was 217.5 people per square mile (84.0/km).  There were 612 housing units at an average density of 94.6/sq mi (36.5/km).  The racial makeup of the township was 99.15% White, 0.43% African American, 0.07% Native American, 0.28% Asian, and 0.07% from two or more races. Hispanic or Latino of any race were 0.85% of the population.

There were 559 households, out of which 29.3% had children under the age of 18 living with them, 59.7% were married couples living together, 8.2% had a female householder with no husband present, and 28.8% were non-families. 21.3% of all households were made up of individuals, and 7.3% had someone living alone who was 65 years of age or older.  The average household size was 2.52 and the average family size was 2.97.

In the township the population was spread out, with 22.4% under the age of 18, 5.8% from 18 to 24, 29.0% from 25 to 44, 29.8% from 45 to 64, and 13.0% who were 65 years of age or older.  The median age was 41 years. For every 100 females, there were 99.4 males.  For every 100 females age 18 and over, there were 100.9 males.

The median income for a household in the township was $52,083, and the median income for a family was $53,958. Males had a median income of $36,765 versus $29,338 for females. The per capita income for the township was $23,779.  About 4.3% of families and 4.9% of the population were below the poverty line, including 8.4% of those under age 18 and 6.5% of those age 65 or over.

Education

Bridgeton Township lies within the Palisades School District.

Climate

According to the Köppen climate classification system, Bridgeton Twp has a Hot-summer, Humid continental climate (Dfa). Dfa climates are characterized by at least one month having an average mean temperature ≤ , at least four months with an average mean temperature ≥ , at least one month with an average mean temperature ≥  and no significant precipitation difference between seasons. Although most summer days are slightly humid in Bridgeton Twp, episodes of heat and high humidity can occur with heat index values > . The average wettest month is July, which corresponds with the annual peak in thunderstorm activity. Episodes of extreme cold and wind can occur, with wind chill values < . Ice storms and large snowstorms depositing ≥  of snow occur once every few years, particularly during nor’easters from December through February.

Transportation

The only numbered highway serving Bridgeton Township is Pennsylvania Route 32. It follows River Road on a northwest-to-southeast alignment parallel to the Delaware River across the northern and northeastern portions of the township.

Ecology

According to the A. W. Kuchler U.S. potential natural vegetation types, Bridgeton Twp would have a dominant vegetation type of Appalachian Oak (104) with a dominant vegetation form of Eastern Hardwood Forest (25). The spring bloom typically begins by April 15 and fall color usually peaks by October 26.

References

External links

Townships in Bucks County, Pennsylvania
Townships in Pennsylvania
Pennsylvania populated places on the Delaware River